Riding the Wind is a 1942 American Western film directed by Edward Killy and starring Tim Holt.

Plot
A cowboy fights against a schemer who is manipulating water rights.

References

External links
 

1942 films
American Western (genre) films
1942 Western (genre) films
Films directed by Edward Killy
Films produced by Bert Gilroy
RKO Pictures films
American black-and-white films
1940s American films